Prinz Ludwig Ferdinand Paul Franz Stanislaus Ulrich Otto Ludolf zu Sayn-Wittgenstein-Berleburg  (4 April 1910 – 22 November 1943) was a highly decorated Oberst in the Wehrmacht during World War II.  He was also a recipient of the Knight's Cross of the Iron Cross. The Knight's Cross of the Iron Cross was awarded to recognise extreme battlefield bravery or successful military leadership.  Ludwig-Ferdinand Prinz von Sayn-Wittgenstein-Berleburg was killed on 22 November 1943 near Zhytomyr, Ukraine.  He was posthumously awarded the Knight's Cross on 20 January 1944 and was also promoted to Oberst.

Early life
Ludwig was the son of Richard, 4th Prince of Sayn-Wittgenstein-Berleburg and Princess Madeleine of Löwenstein-Wertheim-Freudenberg. He had two older brothers, Gustav Albrecht who was also killed in 1944, and Christian Heinrich who died in 1983. Gustav's son Richard was married to Princess Benedikte of Denmark, sister of Queen Margrethe II and of former Queen Anne-Marie of Greece.

Personal life
Ludwig Ferdinand married in 1935 Princess Friederike Juliane of Salm-Horstmar, daughter of Otto II, Prince of Salm-Horstmar (1867-1941) and Countess Rosa of Solms-Baruth (1884-1945). They had five children: 

 Marita, Princess zu Sayn-Wittgenstein-Berleburg (1936-2000), married Count Ulrich Wolf Adolf Grote (b.1940); had issue
 Otto-Ludwig, Prince zu Sayn-Wittgenstein-Berleburg (b.1938), married Baroness Anette von Cramm (b.1944); had issue
 Johann-Stanislaus, Prince zu Sayn-Wittgenstein-Berleburg (b.1939), married Almut Leonhards (b.1943); had issue
 Ludwig-Ferdinand, Prince zu Sayn-Wittgenstein-Berleburg (b.1942), married Countess Yvonne Wachtmeister af Johannishus (b.1951); had issue
 Ulrike-Christine, Princess zu Sayn-Wittgenstein-Berleburg (1944-2021), married Hano von Wulffen (b.1940); had issue

His descendants include Ludwig-Ferdinand's children Princess Anna of Bavaria and Prince August Fredrik zu Sayn-Wittgenstein-Berleburg.

Awards and decorations
 Iron Cross (1939)
 2nd Class (20 May 1940)
 1st Class (10 June 1940)
 Eastern Front Medal
 German Cross in Gold (15 December 1941)
 Knight's Cross of the Iron Cross on 20 January 1944 as Oberstleutnant and commander of Kavallerie-Regiment Süd

Notes

References

Citations

Bibliography

External links
TracesOfWar.com
Ritterkreuztraeger 1939-1945
Das-Ritterkreuz.de

1910 births
1943 deaths
German Army personnel killed in World War II
Recipients of the Gold German Cross
Recipients of the Knight's Cross of the Iron Cross
Ludwig-Ferdinand Prinz von Sayn-Wittgenstein-Berleburg
Reichswehr personnel
People from Siegen-Wittgenstein
Military personnel from North Rhine-Westphalia
German Army officers of World War II